E&A is the second studio album by American hip hop duo Eyedea & Abilities. It was released on Epitaph Records and Rhymesayers Entertainment on March 23, 2004.

Critical reception

Dan Kricke of Stylus Magazine gave the album a grade of B, commenting that "It's more immediately accessible than First Born, and showcases a lot more of both Eyedea & Abilities talents than anything they've done previously." Vish Khanna of Exclaim! wrote, "Blending underground hunger with the confidence of accomplished veterans, Eyedea & Abilities bring some truly dynamic hip-hop to the table with their second album."

Track listing

Personnel
Credits adapted from liner notes.

 Eyedea – vocals, lyrics, engineering, mixing
 DJ Abilities – production, turntables
 Carnage – vocals (5), lyrics (5)
 Sean McPherson – bass guitar (6, 10, 13)
 DJ Infamous – production (10), turntables (10)
 Gene Grimaldi – mastering
 George Thompson – artwork, design

Charts

References

External links
 
 

2004 albums
Eyedea & Abilities albums
Epitaph Records albums
Rhymesayers Entertainment albums